The 1985 San Francisco State Gators football team represented San Francisco State University as a member of the Northern California Athletic Conference (NCAC) during the 1985 NCAA Division II football season. Led by 25th-year head coach Vic Rowen, San Francisco State compiled an overall record of 3–6–1 with a mark of 2–3 in conference play, placing fourth in the NCAC. For the season the team was outscored by its opponents 347 to 252. The Gators played home games at Cox Stadium in San Francisco.

Schedule

References

San Francisco State
San Francisco State Gators football seasons
San Francisco State Gators football